CEN/TC 165 (CEN Technical Committee 165) is a technical decision making body within the CEN system working on standardization in the field of wastewater engineering in the European Union. Its goal is to develop functional standards, and standards for performance and installation for systems and components in the field of wastewater engineering.

CEN/TC 165 was created on 01.01.1988 and Working Groups (WG) established under this Technical Committee are:
 WG1: General requirements for pipes
 WG2: Vitrified clay pipes
 WG4: Manhole tops, gully tops, drainage channels and other ancillary components for use outside buildings
 WG5: Fibre cement pipes
 WG6: Cast iron pipes
 WG7: Steel pipes
 WG8: Separators
 WG9: Concrete pipes
 WG10: Installation of buried pipes for gravity drain and sewer systems
 WG11: Gratings, covers and other ancillary components for use inside buildings
 WG12: Structural design of buried pipelines
 WG13: Renovation and repair of drains and sewers
 WG21: Drainage systems inside buildings
 WG22: Drain and sewer systems outside buildings
 WG23: Special projects
 WG30: Terminology in the field of wastewater engineering
 WG40: Wastewater treatment plants > 50 PT
 WG41: Small type sewage treatment plants (< 50 inhabitants)
 WG42: Working on standards for treatment plants from 51 to 500 population equivalents treatment plants; general processes
 WG43: Wastewater treatment plants; General requirements and special processes
 WG50: Use of treated wastewater

See also
 List of CEN technical committees
 List of EN standards

References

CEN technical committees
EN standards